Sheffield Heeley is a constituency represented in the House of Commons of the UK Parliament since 2015 by Louise Haigh, a member of the Labour Party. It is located in the city of Sheffield, South Yorkshire.

History
This seat was created in 1950, largely replacing the former Sheffield Ecclesall constituency, its boundaries being significantly altered in 1955 with the abolition of Sheffield Neepsend. At its first five elections, up to but excluding 1966, the seat was won by a Conservative, Peter Roberts; it changed hands three times between 1966 and 1974.

Against the national swing, the 1979 election saw Sheffield Heeley move from being a marginal Labour seat to having a solid Labour majority. Of the subsequent elections, only the 1983 and 2010 results have been fairly marginal; the others have suggested a safe Labour seat. At the 2010 election the Liberal Democrat had more than a quarter of the vote, whereas the Conservatives, on 17.3%, garnered 3% more votes than in 2005.

Boundaries

1950–1955: The County Borough of Sheffield wards of Heeley, Nether Edge, Norton, and Woodseats.

1955–1974: The County Borough of Sheffield wards of Heeley, Nether Edge, Norton, Sharrow, and Woodseats.

1974–1983: The County Borough of Sheffield wards of Beauchief, Gleadless, Heeley, and Intake.

1983–2010: The City of Sheffield wards of Beauchief, Heeley, Intake, Norton, and Park.

2010–present: The City of Sheffield wards of Arbourthorne, Beauchief and Greenhill, Gleadless Valley, Graves Park, and Richmond.

Constituency profile
This constituency has a moderate Labour majority and contains a mixture of urban areas. In 2010 the BNP, unusually in Britain, achieved more than the 5% share of the vote necessary to recover the election deposit; its 5.5% share was a record in Sheffield.

The constituency consists of Census Output Areas a local government districts with: a working population whose income is marginally below the national average, and that has close to average reliance upon social housing. At the end of 2012, 5.7% of the population was claiming Jobseekers Allowance, compared to the regional average of 4.7%. The district contributing to the seat has a medium 33% of its population without a car. A medium 24.3% of the city's population are without qualifications, a high 15.8% of the population with level 3 qualifications and a medium 25.7% with level 4 qualifications or above. In terms of tenure, as of the 2011 census, a relatively low 58.3% of homes were owned outright or on a mortgage by occupants across the district.

Members of Parliament

Elections

Elections in the 2010s

Elections in the 2000s
General election of 2005

General election of 2001

Elections in the 1990s
General election of 1997

General election of 1992

Elections in the 1980s

General election of 1983

Elections in the 1970s
General election of 1979

General election of October 1974

General election of February 1974

General election of 1970

Elections in the 1960s
General election of 1966

General election of 1964

Elections in the 1950s
General election of 1959

General election of 1955

General election of 1951

General election of 1950

See also 
 List of parliamentary constituencies in South Yorkshire
 Districts of Sheffield

Notes

References

External links
BBC Election 2005
BBC Vote 2001
Guardian Unlimited Politics (Election results from 1992 to the present) The Guardian

Politicsresources.net - Official Web Site ✔ (Election results from 1951 to the present)
F. W. S. Craig, British Parliamentary Election Results 1918 - 1949
F. W. S. Craig, British Parliamentary Election Results 1950 - 1970
Sheffield General Election Results 1945 - 2001, Sheffield City Council

Heeley
Heeley
Constituencies of the Parliament of the United Kingdom established in 1950